Discosomidae is a family of marine cnidarians closely related to the true sea anemones (Actiniaria). It contains five genera:

 Amplexidiscus
 Discosoma
 Metarhodactis
 Platyzoanthus
 Rhodactis

References & External links

 
Corallimorpharia
Cnidarian families